William D. Palmer (born January 13, 1935) was an American politician in the state of Iowa.

Palmer was born in Iowa City, Iowa. He graduated from East High School in Des Moines and is an insurance executive. He served in the Iowa State Senate from 1969 to 1999, and House of Representatives from 1965 to 1969, as a Democrat.

References

1935 births
Living people
People from Iowa City, Iowa
Democratic Party Iowa state senators
Democratic Party members of the Iowa House of Representatives